The 1914 Baylor football team represented Baylor University during the 1914 college football season. In January 1914, a questionnaire regarding a possible conference was sent out to the larger institutions in Texas, Mississippi, Louisiana, Arkansas, and Oklahoma.  Only Texas A&M failed to express an opinion; all other schools were positive. "No school should be omitted that hasn't the money to keep itself going and be able to play members of the association", Baylor representative C.A. Ganti replied.  "This we could not do."  In late April and early May, eight institutions met to create the Southwest Conference, to which Baylor was invited and did become a charter member in December of that year.  Baylor did not adopt a mascot (the Baylor Bears) until December 14, 1914, after the completion of the 1914 football season.

Schedule

References

Baylor
Baylor Bears football seasons
Baylor Bears football